This list of pest-repelling plants includes plants used for their ability to repel insects, nematodes, and other pests. They have been used in companion planting as pest control in agricultural and garden situations, and in households.

Certain plants have shown effectiveness as topical repellents for haematophagous insects, such as the use of lemon eucalyptus in PMD, but incomplete research and misunderstood applications can produce variable results.

The essential oils of many plants are also well known for their pest-repellent properties. Oils from the families Lamiaceae (mints), Poaceae (true grasses), and Pinaceae (pines) are common haematophagous insect repellents worldwide.

Table of pest-repelling plants 
Plants that can be planted or used fresh to repel pests include:

References 

pest-repelling plants
+
Insect repellents

pest-repelling plants
pest-repelling plants